David Mandelbaum (born December 13, 1935) is an American Democratic Party politician, minority-owner of the Minnesota Vikings NFL team, and real estate developer.

Early life
Mandelbaum was born to a Jewish family on December 13, 1935 in Newark, New Jersey, the son of Philip Mandelbaum (June 22, 1908 – June 30, 2004) and Ella Baum Mandelbaum (1911–1999). He grew up in Maplewood, New Jersey. He is a graduate of Princeton University and Harvard University Law School. He is a partner at the law firm of Mandelbaum & Mandelbaum.

New Jersey State Assemblyman
He was elected to the New Jersey General Assembly in 1961, at the age of 25. He finished fourth in a field of 28 candidates for nine Essex County At-Large Assembly seats. He received 140,037 votes, more than 12,000 votes ahead of incumbent Republican Assemblyman Philip Lindeman. He was narrowly re-elected in 1963, finishing 1,065 votes ahead of another Democratic Assemblyman, John J. Miller, Jr.  He was re-elected by more than 24,000 votes in 1965.

Campaign for State Senator
Mandelbaum ran for the New Jersey State Senate in 1967. The General Election turned out to be a strong environment for Republicans; it was the mid-term election of Governor Richard J. Hughes's second term. Republicans won all six Essex County Senate seats, with Matturri running third. Mandelbaum finished tenth in the election. The four Democratic Senators elected in 1965 -- Nicholas Fernicola, John J. Giblin, Maclyn Goldman and Hutchins Inge—were all defeated.

1967 Essex County State Senator General Election results

Business Activities
In 1968, Mandelbaum contributed $250,000 towards the formation of Interstate Properties, a real estate development firm, with Steven Roth and Russell Wight. The firm later took control of the Vornado fan company (previously acquired by the Two Guys department store chain) and turned it into the Vornado Realty Trust.  Mandelbaum has been a trustee of the trust since 1979, and a Director of Alexander's, Inc. since 1995.

In 2005, Mandelbaum and five other partners, in a group led by Zygi Wilf, purchased the Minnesota Vikings of the National Football League from Red McCombs for a reported 600 million. Forbes estimates the 2014 value of the franchise at 1.007 billion, or 21st of the 32 NFL teams.

Mandelbaum and his family were named 384th on the Forbes 400 list in 2005, with an estimated net worth of $900 million.

Family
David Mandelbaum married Karen Krupnick in a Jewish ceremony in 1964. They have four sons: Richard, Michael, Jeffrey and Jonathan.

References

1935 births
Living people
People from Maplewood, New Jersey
Jewish American sportspeople
Politicians from Newark, New Jersey
Princeton University alumni
Harvard Law School alumni
Businesspeople from New Jersey
Democratic Party members of the New Jersey General Assembly
New Jersey lawyers
Minnesota Twins owners
21st-century American Jews